Love in Pawn is a 1953 British comedy film directed by Charles Saunders and starring Bernard Braden, Barbara Kelly and Jeannie Carson.

Cast
 Bernard Braden as Roger Fox
 Barbara Kelly as Jean Fox
 Reg Dixon as Albert Trusslove
 Jeannie Carson as Amber Trusslove
 John Laurie as Mr. McCutcheon
 Laurence Naismith as Uncle Amos
 Walter Crisham as Hilary Stitfall
 Avice Landone as Amelia Trusslove
 Dorothy Gordon as Marlene
 Alan Robinson as Arnold Bibcock
 Tom Gill as Fred Pollock
 Hal Osmond as Burglar
 Ronnie Stevens as Grocer
 Kathleen Stuart as Natalie
 Michael Balfour as Alaric
 Sam Kydd (actor) Uncredited

References

External links
 

1953 films
British comedy films
Films directed by Charles Saunders
1953 comedy films
British black-and-white films
Films set in London
1950s English-language films
1950s British films